Carrollton Township is one of twenty current townships in Boone County, Arkansas, USA. As of the 2010 census, its total population was 843.

Geography

Cities, towns, and villages
Alpena (part)

Population history
Between 1920 and 1980, the population of Boone County's Carrollton Township included the total population of the town of Alpena, even though Alpena is in both Boone County and in parts of two townships in Carroll County. Starting in 2000, the US Census broke the population of Alpena down by township across both counties.

References
 United States Census Bureau 2008 TIGER/Line Shapefiles
 United States Board on Geographic Names (GNIS)
 United States National Atlas

 Census 2010 U.S. Gazetteer Files: County Subdivisions in Arkansas

External links
 US-Counties.com
 City-Data.com

Townships in Boone County, Arkansas
Townships in Arkansas